Gentry House may refer to:

Gentry House (Danville, Kentucky), listed on the National Register of Historic Places in Boyle County, Kentucky
William T. Gentry House, Atlanta, Georgia, listed on the National Register of Historic Places listings in DeKalb County, Georgia
William H. Gentry House, Sedalia, Missouri, listed on the National Register of Historic Places in Pettis County, Missouri
Payne-Gentry House, Bridgeton, Missouri, listed on the # National Register of Historic Places in St. Louis County, Missouri

See also
Gentry Apartments, Joplin, Missouri, listed on the National Register of Historic Places in Jasper County, Missouri
Sharpe-Gentry Farm, Propst Crossroads, North Carolina, listed on the National Register of Historic Places in Catawba County, North Carolina